In the rail transport system of Bangladesh, diesel locomotives are used. Among diesel locos, there are diesel-electric and diesel-hydraulic locos. Besides diesel locos, steam locos were used in the past, but now they are no longer used. By gauge, there are narrow-gauge (762 mm), meter-gauge (1,000 mm) and broad-gauge (1,676 mm) locos in Bangladesh. Among them, as no narrow-gauge railroads are active, so the narrow-gauge locos are not used anymore.

As of 2020, total 476 meter-gauge and broad-gauge diesel locos (including the old 11 class 3000 locos) have been imported in Bangladesh. Most of them are diesel-electric, but 80 locos are diesel-hydraulic. Among the 476 locos, 349 are meter-gauge and 127 are broad-gauge. All diesel-hydraulic locos were produced by Ganz-MÁVAG of Hungary. Various companies produced the diesel-electric locos, notable among them are GMD, ALCO, MLW, Hyundai Rotem. and DLW, Progress Rail.

Diesel locomotives

Meter-gauge diesel locomotives

Broad-gauge diesel locomotives

List of preserved Diesel locomotives

Steam locomotives

A small number of steam locomotives are preserved in Bangladesh.
 

 
The  gauge locomotives are from the Rupsa-Bagerhat railway which was the only  gauge line in East Pakistan when colonial India was partitioned in 1947. It was re-gauged to  gauge in 1970.

References